Palestina is a town and municipality in the Huila Department, Colombia.

References

Municipalities of Huila Department